Iryo is a brand of Intermodalidad de Levante S.A., a private high-speed rail operator in Spain. The company is jointly owned by Trenitalia, Air Nostrum, and the infrastructure investment fund Globalvia.

Trains began operating on the Madrid–Barcelona high-speed rail line in November 2022, in competition with the national railway Renfe's AVE and Avlo services, and the French-owned low-cost carrier Ouigo España. Spain is therefore the first country in Europe with three competing high-speed rail operators.

Service began with 12 trains per day on the route between Madrid and Barcelona, sometimes calling at Zaragoza. Iryo added a Madrid–Cuenca–Valencia route in December 2022, with Madrid–Córdoba–Seville/Malaga trains scheduled to start operating in March 2023 and Madrid–Albacete–Alicante trains announced for June 2023.

For rolling stock, the company ordered twenty new Frecciarossa 1000 units, similar to those used in Italy since 2015. Nine of these had arrived by the time service to Barcelona began. In the longer term, they may also acquire variable-gauge trains to enable service to areas in Galicia which are accessible only via Iberian-gauge tracks.

See also
AVE
Ouigo España

External links
Iryo official web site

References

High-speed rail in Spain